Carmelo "Cholo" Simeone, (22 September 1934 – 11 October 2014) was an Argentine football defender who won three league championships with Boca Juniors and played for the Argentina national team. Nicknamed "Cholo", he was known for his energetic playing style.

Club career

Simeone started his playing career in 1955 with Vélez Sársfield. In 1961 he joined Boca Juniors where he was an important defensive player in the teams that won the Argentine Primera in 1962, 1964 and 1965. Simeone left Boca In 1967 and spent some time playing for Sportivo Belgrano in the lower leagues of Argentine football.

International career
Simeone represented Argentina in their victorious Copa América campaign in 1959, and at the 1966 FIFA World Cup; in total he made 22 appearances for the national side between 1959 and 1966.

Honours

Club
 Boca Juniors
Primera División Argentina: 1962, 1964, 1965

Argentina
Copa América: 1959
Taça das Nações: 1964

References

External links

Boca Juniors profile 

1934 births
2014 deaths
Sportspeople from Buenos Aires Province
Argentine people of Italian descent
Argentine footballers
Association football defenders
Argentine Primera División players
Club Atlético Vélez Sarsfield footballers
Boca Juniors footballers
Argentina international footballers
1966 FIFA World Cup players